Edward Richardson (1830/31–1915) was an engineer and New Zealand politician.

Edward Richardson may also refer to:

Edward George Richardson (1903–1987), nationalist politician in Northern Ireland
J. Edward Richardson (1873–?), American architect
Edward Richardson (cricketer) (1929–2009), Australian cricketer
Edward Richardson (gymnast) (1879–1961)
Edward Richardson (priest) (1862–1921), Archdeacon of Blackburn
Ted Richardson (1902–?), footballer
Eddie Richardson, English criminal
Eddie Richardson (cricketer) (born 1990), Irish cricketer
Edward A. Richardson (born 1924), Connecticut tree expert

See also
Ed Richardson